Ebrahim Karimabadi was an Iranian lawyer, journalist, and café owner.

He held a bachelor of law from University of Tehran and started his career in journalism in 1946. He owned a daily called Asnaf and served as the director of another daily, Mashrutiyat. Karimabadi was head of the cafee- and teahouse owners' guild, and mobilized them in support of the government of Mohammad Mosaddegh. Along with Mohammad-Hassan Shamshiri, he was among the major bazaari leaders in the National Front.

References

1917 births
National Front (Iran) people
Iranian restaurateurs
20th-century Iranian lawyers
Iranian journalists
Iranian trade unionists
1980s deaths
20th-century journalists